Sarcopenic obesity is a medical condition which is defined as the presence of both sarcopenia (loss of muscle) and obesity. Sarcopenia refers to the presence of low muscle mass and either low muscular strength or low physical performance. When this is accompanied by a high fat mass the condition is known as sarcopenic obesity.

Symptoms
The symptoms are similar to those of sarcopenia and obesity. The individual may show a BMI that is appropriate and healthy to his or her age but will look fat in appearance.

Causes
The disease is caused due to a variety of reasons:
It can be due to aging, wherein muscles become weak due to a lack of exercise, and the individual gains weight due to the same reason.
In other cases, the cause is genetic, wherein the individual is born with a reduced ability to grow muscle mass.

Diagnosis
Sarcopenic obesity is a combination of high body fat and low BMI.
Can be diagnosed by measures such as waist-hip ratio.

Treatment
An appropriate weight training and weight loss program can help to improve the patient's condition.

See also
 Normal weight obesity
 Weight training
 Journal of Cachexia, Sarcopenia and Muscle

References

Medical conditions related to obesity
Aging-associated diseases